Julia Rosolovsky Greer is a materials scientist and is the Ruben F. and Donna Mettler Professor of Materials Science, Mechanics and Medical Engineering at the California Institute of Technology (Caltech). As of 2019, Greer is also the director of the Kavli Nanoscience Institute at Caltech.

As a pioneer in the field of nanomechanics and architected materials, Greer has earned many awards, such as being named a CNN 2020 Visionary, for her work investigating how materials behave at the nano-scale. Greer has been a professor at Caltech since 2007, and is also an Associate Editor at both Extreme Mechanics Letters and Nano Letters.

Early life and education 
Greer was born in Moscow, Russia, and moved to the U.S. with her parents at the age of 16. Greer attended the Massachusetts Institute of Technology (MIT) for college, where she received a Bachelors of Science in Chemical Engineering and a minor in Advanced Music Performance in 1997. Greer then went on to receive graduate degrees in Materials Science and Engineering; she earned a Masters of Science (M.S.) in 2000 and Doctor of Philosophy (Ph.D.) in 2005, both from Stanford University. Between receiving her M.S. and Ph.D., Greer worked at Intel from 2000-2003. For her dissertation, titled "Size dependence of strength of gold at the micron scale in the absence of strain gradients," Greer worked with materials scientist William D. Nix studying the mechanical properties of nanopillars. After her PhD, Greer pursued postdoctoral studies at the Palo Alto Research Center (PARC) from 2005-2007.

Research and career 
Greer joined the Materials Science Department at Caltech in 2007 as an Assistant Professor; she received tenure and was promoted to Full Professor in 2013. Her research focuses on the application of nanotechnology in biomedical materials, multi-functional devices, energy storage, and material synthesis.

Greer has received much recognition and several career awards for her work. Her lab's early work has resulted in a new direction in nanomechanics. Her lab is now harnessing strategies in nanofabrication for applications ranging from improving lithium ion batteries to developing biomedical devices.

Awards and recognition 

 2008 - Technology Review's Top Young Innovators Under 35
2010 - Nominee for World Technology Network’s World Technology Award in Materials
2011 - Sia Nemat-Nasser Early Career Award
 2011 - DOE Early Career Research Program Award
 2011 - The Materials, Metals, and Minerals Society (TMS) Young Leader Professional Development Award
2012 - Popular Mechanics Breakthrough Award
2012 - NASA (inaugural) Early Career Faculty Award
 2012 - Invitee to World Economic Forum (WEF) in Davos
 2013 - Society of Engineering Science (SES) Young Investigator Medal
 2013 - The Materials, Metals, and Minerals Society (TMS) Early Career Faculty Award
 2013 - Discussion Leader at and invitee to World Economic Forum (WEF) meeting in Davos
 2013 - Speaker at the 2013 China-America Frontiers of Engineering Symposium
 2013 - American Chemical Society (ACS) Nano Letters Young Investigator Award and Lectureship
 2014 - Speaker at Google’s Solve for X Conference
 2014 - Young Global Leader by the World Economic Forum (WEF)
 2014 - One of “100 Most Creative People” by Fast Company Magazine
 2014 - Robert W. Cahn “Best Paper Prize” by Journal of Materials Science (shared with L. Meza)
 2014 - Kavli Foundation Early Career Lectureship in Materials Science Recipients by the Materials Research Society (MRS)
2015 - Speaker at the 2015 U.S. Frontiers of Engineering Symposium
 2015 - Midwest Mechanics Tour Lecturer
 2015 - Gilbreth Lecturer for the National Academy of Engineering
 2015 - Technology Review’s Top-10 Emerging Technologies
 2016 - CNN's 2020 Visionary
 2016 - U.S. Department of Defense's (DOD) National Security Science and Engineering Faculty Fellow
2016 - U.S. Department of Defense's (DOD) Vannevar Bush Faculty Fellow
2018 - Featured in Caltech's Breakthrough Campaign
2019 - AAAFM Heeger Award

Personal life 
In addition to being a scientist, Greer is also an accomplished pianist. She took piano lessons starting at age 5 and has studied music at several institutions, including Moscow's Gnessin School of Music, the Eastman School of Music, MIT, the San Francisco Conservatory of Music, and Stanford University.

Greer also loves rollerblading. She will occasionally rollerblade to and from work and has even participated in a rollerblading marathon.

External media and links 
 Lecture given at the 2014 MRS Fall Meeting for receiving the Kavli Early Career Award in Nanoscience: "Three Dimensional Architected Nanostructured Meta-Materials"
 Talk given at TEDxCERN in 2014: "The surprising strengths of materials in the nanoworld"
 Talk given at TEDxManhattanBeach in 2016: "Nanotechnology: When Less is More"
 STEM Gems feature: "Bigger Doesn’t Always Mean Stronger: Julia Greer is Changing the Idea of How Materials Are Made"
 
 
 Lab website

References 

MIT School of Engineering alumni
Living people
Year of birth missing (living people)
California Institute of Technology faculty
Russian women physicists
American women physicists
American women academics
21st-century American women